Lepidophyma gaigeae, Gaige's tropical night lizard, is a species of lizard in the family Xantusiidae. It is a small lizard found in eastern Mexico. It is native to the Sierra Madre Oriental of northern Querétaro state and adjacent northwestern Hidalgo state, between 1,800 and 2,200 meters elevation.

References

Lepidophyma
Endemic reptiles of Mexico
Fauna of the Sierra Madre Oriental
Reptiles described in 1936